Pazinaclone (DN-2327) is a sedative and anxiolytic drug in the cyclopyrrolone family of drugs. Some other cyclopyrrolone drugs include zopiclone and eszopiclone.

Pazinaclone has a very similar pharmacological profile to the benzodiazepines including sedative and anxiolytic properties, but with less amnestic effects, and at low doses it is a relatively selective anxiolytic, with sedative effects only appearing at higher doses.

Pazinaclone produces its sedative and anxiolytic effects by acting as a partial agonist at GABAA benzodiazepine receptors, although pazinaclone is more subtype-selective than most benzodiazepines.

Synthesis

Reaction of 2-amino-7-chloro-1,8-naphthyridine with phthalic anhydride leads to the corresponding phthalimide. Selective reduction of one of the imide carbonyl groups in essence converts that to an aldehyde. Condensation with tert-butyl(triphenylphosphoranylidene)acetate gives the Wittig product.

The carboxylic acid is then treated with diethyl cyanophosphonate to convert that to an activated acid cyanide; reaction with 1,4-dioxa-8-azaspiro[4.5]decane results in formation of the corresponding amide, pazinaclone.

See also
Pagoclone

References 

Cyclopyrrolones
Sedatives
Isoindolines
Lactams
Acetamides
Naphthyridines
GABAA receptor positive allosteric modulators